David González Sanz (born 16 April 1985) is a Spanish football coach.

Coaching career
González began coaching in his native Spain, coaching in the academy of Athletic Bilbao, as well as coaching at Unió Atlètica d'Horta and UD Mutilvera. In 2016, González moved to the Dominican Republic, joining Real Madrid's academy in the country. González later took up the role of technical director at Atlético San Cristóbal, managing the club for a short stint in March 2019. In May 2019, the Dominican Football Federation announced the appointment of González as manager of both the Dominican Republic national football team and the Dominican Republican under-23 side.

References

1985 births
Living people
Spanish expatriate football managers
Dominican Republic national football team managers
Spanish football managers
Spanish expatriate sportspeople in the Dominican Republic
Athletic Bilbao non-playing staff
Real Madrid CF non-playing staff
Association football coaches